was a village located in Kita District, Ehime Prefecture, Japan.

As of 2003, the village had an estimated population of 1,220 and a density of 22.97 persons per km². The total area was 53.12 km².

On January 11, 2005, Kawabe, along with the towns of Hijikawa and Nagahama (all from Kita District), was merged into the expanded city of Ōzu and no longer exists as an independent municipality.

External links
Official website of Ōzu in Japanese

Dissolved municipalities of Ehime Prefecture